The Battle of San Salvador (1641), also known as the First Battle of San Salvador, was an expedition launched by the Dutch and their aboriginal allies in Taiwan against the Spanish  in 1641.

Background
As Chinese merchants brought news of the Spanish withdrawal to the Dutch, telling them that the Spanish intended to abandon Formosa altogether and were merely waiting for permission from the king. The Dutch were growing interested in northern Taiwan because they had heard reports of gold mines in the northeast and felt they could not go prospecting until the Spanish had been removed. After making contact with the aborigines of Danshui, the Dutch decided to launch their attack. 

In courteous terms, the Dutch Governor Paulus Traudenius informed the Spanish governor of their intentions.

The Spanish governor was not inclined to give in so easily and replied in kind.

The siege

In August 1641, a Dutch expedition sailed to the Bay of Jilong to study the Spaniards' situation and, if possible, capture San Salvador. Warned by an aboriginal friend, the Spanish prepared for an attack. The Dutch soldiers landed on the shore of the bay across from the island. Since the Spanish governor had refused to allow aborigines to seek refuge in the fortress, many fled into the mountains. The Dutch brought with them some 500 northern aborigines, they entered Kimaurri without opposition. They spent the night there and the next morning climbed the hill behind the village and proceeded methodically to count the Spanish infantry by telescope, "seeing in this way everything that they wanted to." Later, even though the Dutch outnumbered the Spanish and had the support of hundreds of aborigines, the Dutch commander realized he did not have enough cannons to mount a proper siege. The Dutch disengaged and left, burning Kimaurri on the way.

Aftermath

As the Spanish watched the Dutch depart, they were impressed by the number and orderliness of their enemies' aboriginal allies. "The enemy," wrote one, "convened the entire Danshui River and all the villages that are under their jurisdiction, which was a very large number of Indians, and, when from this fortress we saw them arrayed at intervals on the hills and beaches, we [realized] that they [the Indians] were an army." Indeed, on their way back from San Salvador to southwestern Taiwan, the Dutch made an agreement with the "natives of Danshui," promising them protection against their enemies. Not long afterward, emissaries from Danshui went to the Dutch headquarters in Zeelandia and, according to Dutch sources, officially handed over their lands to the Dutch, in the same manner that the villages of the southwestern plains had done in the 1630s. The balance of power had changed in Formosa. Without help from Manila, the Spanish had little means of withstanding a Dutch attack, which is exactly what happened in the Second Battle of San Salvador.

The Spanish celebrated the departure of the Dutch with a procession of thanksgiving. But the Dutch had already delivered a major blow to Spanish authority in Taiwan. By making peace with the aborigines in Danshui, the Dutch turned an area that had once been a central part of the Pax Hispanica into enemy territory for the Spanish. Moreover, by burning Kimaurri and mocking the Spanish beneath their very fortress, the Dutch had denigrated the Spaniards' military reputation, an attribute most necessary in the warlike world of seventeenth-century Formosa. The Spanish governor complained to Governor-General Corcuera that he could no longer persuade the aborigines to cooperate even in small matters: "They are traitors and are risen against us, being of a nature that they only help those who vanquish them."

See also
 Spanish Formosa
 Dutch Formosa
 Spanish East Indies
 :Category:History of the Philippines (1565–1898), Spanish colonial period in the Philippines

References

Spanish Formosa
Spanish East Indies
Dutch Formosa
History of the Philippines (1565–1898)
1642 in New Spain